As of March 2014, American pop and R&B singer Ashanti has released six studio albums, twenty-four singles, and twenty-one music videos on her record labels Murder Inc., Def Jam, and Motown.

Ashanti's eponymous debut album was released in April 2002, and sold over three million copies in the United States. It produced the number-one hit "Foolish", the top ten hit "Happy" and the top twenty single "Baby". Her second album Chapter II (2003), another platinum-seller, was released a year after and enjoyed international chart success, spawning the top ten hits "Rock Wit U (Awww Baby)" and "Rain on Me". The singer's third studio album Concrete Rose was released in December 2004 stateside and certified platinum by the RIAA one month after release. A minor success in international music markets, however it produced two singles only, including the top twenty hit single "Only U". Following a hiatus and a label switch from Murda Inc to Motown, Ashanti's The Declaration (2008) was released in June 2008 in the United States. Throughout her career Ashanti has sold nearly 15 million records worldwide.

Albums

Studio albums

Compilation albums

Extended plays

Singles

As lead artist

As featured artist

Promotional singles

Guest appearances

Soundtracks

DVDs

Music videos

As lead artist

As featured artist

Notes

References

Discography
Pop music discographies
Contemporary R&B discographies
Discographies of American artists
Soul music discographies